Ad Daff is the main district in Khulais city in Makkah Province, in western Saudi Arabia.

See also 

 List of cities and towns in Saudi Arabia
 Regions of Saudi Arabia

References

Populated places in Mecca Province